In geometry of the Euclidean plane, a 33344-33434 tiling is one of two of 20 2-uniform tilings of the Euclidean plane by regular polygons. They contains regular triangle and square faces, arranged in two vertex configuration: 3.3.3.4.4 and 3.3.4.3.4. 

The first has triangles in groups of 3 and square in groups of 1 and 2. It has 4 types of faces and 5 types of edges. 

The second has triangles in groups of 4, and squares in groups of 2. It has 3 types of face and 6 types of edges.

Geometry
Its two vertex configurations are shared with two 1-uniform tilings:

Circle Packings 
These 2-uniform tilings can be used as a circle packings.

In the first 2-uniform tiling (whose dual resembles a key-lock pattern): cyan circles are in contact with 5 other circles (3 cyan, 2 pink), corresponding to the V33.42 planigon, and pink circles are also in contact with 5 other circles (4 cyan, 1 pink), corresponding to the V32.4.3.4 planigon. It is homeomorphic to the ambo operation on the tiling, with the cyan and pink gap polygons corresponding to the cyan and pink circles (mini-vertex configuration polygons; one dimensional duals to the respective planigons). Both images coincide.

In the second 2-uniform tiling (whose dual resembles jagged streams of water): cyan circles are in contact with 5 other circles (2 cyan, 3 pink), corresponding to the V33.42 planigon, and pink circles are also in contact with 5 other circles (3 cyan, 2 pink), corresponding to the V32.4.3.4 planigon. It is homeomorphic to the ambo operation on the tiling, with the cyan and pink gap polygons corresponding to the cyan and pink circles (mini-vertex configuration polygons; one dimensional duals to the respective planigons). Both images coincide.

Dual tilings
The dual tilings have right triangle and kite faces, defined by face configurations: V3.3.3.4.4 and V3.3.4.3.4, and can be seen combining the prismatic pentagonal tiling and Cairo pentagonal tilings.

Notes

References
 Keith Critchlow, Order in Space: A design source book, 1970, pp. 62–67
 Ghyka, M. The Geometry of Art and Life, (1946), 2nd edition, New York: Dover, 1977. Demiregular tiling #15
  pp. 35–43
 Sacred Geometry Design Sourcebook: Universal Dimensional Patterns, Bruce Rawles, 1997. pp. 36–37 
 Introduction to Tessellations, Dale Seymour, Jill Britton, (1989), p.57, Fig 3-24 Tessellations of regular polygons that contain more than one type of vertex point

External links 
 
 
 
 In Search of Demiregular Tilings, Helmer Aslaksen
 n-uniform tilings  Brian Galebach, 2-Uniform Tiling 1 of 20

Euclidean plane geometry
Tessellation